José Antonio Huelga Stadium is a multi-use stadium in Sancti Spíritus, Cuba.  It is currently used mostly for baseball games and is the home stadium of Sancti Spíritus Gallos.  The stadium holds 13,000 people. Architects: Rogelio Arrieta and Eduardo Garcia.

Baseball venues in Cuba
Buildings and structures in Sancti Spíritus